Phillip Edwin Scott (August 12, 1870 – November 1, 1933) was a Major League Baseball player who played pitcher from -. He would play for the Cincinnati Reds and Cleveland Blues.

He is notable for becoming only the second Major League pitcher (and fourth MLB player overall) in history to hit a home run in their final at-bat, doing so on August 3, 1901 for Cleveland, which also made him the first to do so in the American League.

Personal life
Son of James C. and Sarah F. (Loop) Scott, Ed Scott married about 1890 Olive Faneuff, daughter of Maxim and Hermine (Beaugrand) Faneuff.

References

External links

1870 births
1933 deaths
Major League Baseball pitchers
Baseball players from Ohio
Cincinnati Reds players
Cleveland Blues (1901) players
Grand Rapids Bob-o-links players
Indianapolis Hoosiers (minor league) players
Toronto Maple Leafs (International League) players
19th-century baseball players